Entalinidae is a family of tusk shells, marine scaphopod mollusks in the order Gadilida.

Genera
 Bathoxiphus Pilsbry & Sharp, 1897
 Costentalina Chistikov, 1982
 Entalina Monterosato, 1872
 Entalinopsis Habe, 1957
 Heteroschismoides Ludbrook, 1960
 Pertusiconcha Chistikov, 1982
 Rhomboxiphus Chistikov, 1983
 Solenoxiphus Chistikov, 1983
 Spadentalina Habe, 1963

References

External links
 Steiner, G.; Kabat, A. R. (2001). Catalogue of supraspecific taxa of Scaphopoda (Mollusca). Zoosystema. 23(3): 433-460
 

Scaphopods